Grigorovskaya is a rural locality (a village) in Kolengskoye Rural Settlement, Verkhovazhsky District, Vologda Oblast, Russia. The population was 9 as of 2002.

Geography 
Grigorovskaya is located 62 km east of Verkhovazhye (the district's administrative centre) by road. Udaltsovskaya is the nearest rural locality.

References 

Rural localities in Verkhovazhsky District